Finger Of Doom is a 1972 Hong Kong film.

References

1972 films
Hong Kong martial arts films
1970s action films
1970s Mandarin-language films
Wuxia films
1970s Hong Kong films